Taltoli Primary Public School also called Bilayet-un-Nissa Primary School is a public primary school of Taltoli in Chandpur District of the Chittagong Division of Bangladesh.

History
It was named after Bilayet-un-Nissa Khanem, the wife of Ab'dul Hamid Munshi of the Munshibari family of Comilla who made a school for her because she wanted to attend lessons outside of the residence. In the late 1800s, Muslim women were not allowed to regularly visit outside of the private quarters of the residences. The family employed regional teachers, as first starting with lessons in Urdu, Persian and Arabic delivered by Islamic teachers from the Munshibari Jama Masjid.

Curriculum
After the war of 1971, the Government of Bangladesh took over the school and declared it a public institution under the curriculum of the Ministry of Education.

Sources

External links

Official website of the Ministry of Primary and Mass Education

Schools in Chandpur District
Government Primary Schools in Bangladesh